"Space Cadet" is a song by American record producer Metro Boomin, featuring vocals from American rapper Gunna. It was sent to rhythmic contemporary radio through Boominati and Republic on January 29, 2019, as the second single of Metro's debut studio album, Not All Heroes Wear Capes (2018).

Background
"Space Cadet" is primarily produced by Metro Boomin and Wheezy, with Allen Ritter as an additional producer. Meanwhile, the vocals are handled by Gunna, with background vocals at the end from American rapper and singer Travis Scott, a close friend and frequent collaborator of both Metro and Gunna. On the song, Gunna raps about his lavish lifestyle. It is mostly a reference to the Rolls-Royce Wraith, an expensive car that is known for its starry ceiling. A space cadet is a trainee astronaut.

It marks the second official collaboration between Metro and Gunna, following Gunna's 2018 song "Car Sick", which also features Canadian rapper Nav, who is a close friend and frequent collaborator of both artists. The song is from Gunna's commercial mixtape, Drip Season 3, to which Metro served as an executive producer on and also produced four other songs from the project, "Helluva Price", "Pedestrian", "My Soul", and "No Joke". Gunna also makes another appearance on the album alongside American rapper and label boss Young Thug on the song "Lesbian".

Critical reception
While talking about "Space Cadet", Alphonse Pierre from Pitchfork opined:On "Space Cadet", Metro ushers Gunna into "The Twilight Zone" with a twinkling instrumental, and Gunna responds with one of the album's bounciest hooks. The "Space Cadet" instrumental, like so much of the album's production, feels cinematic but thankfully not far removed from his Atlanta-built sound.

Chart performance
"Space Cadet" debuted and peaked at number 51 on the US Billboard Hot 100 chart, on the week of November 17, 2018. The single also debuted at number 22 on the US Hot R&B/Hip-Hop Songs chart. On December 9, 2020, the song was certified double platinum by the Recording Industry Association of America (RIAA) for combined sales and streaming equivalent units of over two million units in the United States.

Music video
The official music video for "Space Cadet" premiered on April 22, 2019. It was directed by Zac Facts. Metro Boomin and Gunna are dancing and floating around in lasers and bright lights, like a simulation of outer space. Young Thug, a close friend and frequent collaborator of both artists, makes a cameo appearance.

Live performances
On February 11, 2019, Metro Boomin and Gunna performed the song live on The Tonight Show Starring Jimmy Fallon. In tribute of American rapper 21 Savage, a longtime close friend and frequent collaborator of Metro, the latter wore a jacket with the words "Free 21 Savage". The rapper was in jail at the time of the performance for illegally being in the United States of America, but was released the following day.

Charts

Certifications

Release history

References

2019 songs
2019 singles
Song recordings produced by Metro Boomin
Song recordings produced by Allen Ritter
Song recordings produced by Wheezy (record producer)
Songs written by Metro Boomin
Songs written by Gunna (rapper)
Songs written by Wheezy (record producer)
Songs written by Allen Ritter
Metro Boomin songs
Gunna (rapper) songs